Gumowo may refer to the following places:
Gumowo, Ciechanów County in Masovian Voivodeship (east-central Poland)
Gumowo, Ostrów Mazowiecka County in Masovian Voivodeship (east-central Poland)
Gumowo, Płońsk County in Masovian Voivodeship (east-central Poland)